The Dziwna is a channel of the Oder River in northwestern Poland, one of three straits connecting the Oder Lagoon with the Bay of Pomerania of the Baltic Sea.  It separates the island of Wolin from the rest of the Polish mainland.  The other two channels are the Świna and the Peene.

About  in length, the Dziwna forms on the eastern end of the Szczecin Lagoon, near the town of Zagórze, Kamień County.  Flowing north, it passes the town of Wolin and then widens and forms a number of connected features.  Towards the west the main channel of the Dziwna forms the large Kamieński Lagoon (Polish: Zalew Kamieński).  To the east a side channel develops into the Zatoka Cicha (Quiet Bay, known as Die Maad before 1949), flows north through the strait of Promna as it approaches the city of Kamień Pomorski, then rejoins the Kamieński Lagoon.  Between these two channels stands the small, largely agricultural island of Chrząszczewo connected to Kamień Pomorski by a single bridge.

The Kamieński Lagoon reforms into the well-defined Zatoka Wrzosowska (Wrzosowska Bay), narrows, then flows past the coastal city of Dziwnów for just a few kilometers as the Dziwna again before finally reaching the Bay of Pomerania.

References 

Channels of Europe
0Dziwna
Landforms of West Pomeranian Voivodeship
Straits of the Baltic Sea
Straits of Poland